Köksalan, historically and still informally called Mertmenge, is a village in the Şehitkamil District, Gaziantep Province, Turkey. The village is inhabited by Turkmens of the Elbegli tribe and had a population of 1119 in 2021.

References

Villages in Şehitkamil District